Ed Gruchalla is a North Dakota Democratic-NPL Party member of the North Dakota House of Representatives, representing the 45th district since 2007.

External links
North Dakota Legislative Assembly - Representative Edmund Gruchalla official ND House of Representatives website
Project Vote Smart - Representative Ed Gruchalla (ND) profile
Follow the Money - Ed Gruchalla
2006 campaign contributions
North Dakota Democratic-NPL Party - Representative Edmund Gruchalla profile

1947 births
Living people
People from Jamestown, North Dakota
Politicians from Fargo, North Dakota
Valley City State University alumni
American state police officers
21st-century American politicians
Democratic Party members of the North Dakota House of Representatives